The 2014–15 Northern Colorado Bears women's basketball team represented the University of Northern Colorado during the 2014–15 NCAA Division I women's basketball season. The Bears were led by first year head coach Kamie Ethridge and played their home games at the Bank of Colorado Arena. They were a member of the Big Sky Conference. They finish the season 21–12, 12–6 in Big Sky for a tie to finish in third place. They advance to the championship game 2015 Big Sky Conference women's basketball tournament where they lost to Montana. They were invited to the 2015 Women's National Invitation Tournament where they defeated Colorado State and South Dakota in the first and second rounds before losing to UCLA in the third round.

Roster

Schedule

|-
!colspan=9 style="background:#000066; color:#FFCC33;"| Exhibition

|-
!colspan=9 style="background:#000066; color:#FFCC33;"| Regular season

|-
!colspan=9 style="background:#000066; color:#FFCC33;"| Big Sky Women's Tournament

|-
!colspan=9 style="background:#000066; color:#FFCC33;"| WNIT

See also
2014–15 Northern Colorado Bears men's basketball team

References

Northern Colorado
Northern Colorado Bears women's basketball seasons
2015 Women's National Invitation Tournament participants
Northern Colorado
Northern Colorado